The 1986 Nordic Figure Skating Championships were held from February 21st through 23rd, 1986 in Turku, Finland. The competition was open to elite figure skaters from Nordic countries. Skaters competed in two disciplines, men's singles and ladies' singles across two levels: senior (Olympic-level) and junior.

Senior results

Men

Ladies

Junior results

Men

Ladies

References

Nordic Figure Skating Championships, 1986
Nordic Figure Skating Championships, 1986
Nordic Figure Skating Championships
International figure skating competitions hosted by Finland
International sports competitions in Turku
Winter sports competitions in Finland